City of Rocks State Park is a state park in New Mexico, consisting of large sculptured rock formations in the shape of pinnacles or boulders rising as high as .

Geology
The bedrock forming City of Rocks was created 34.9 million years ago by a volcanic eruption. Then over millions of years, erosion sculpted the rock formations seen today. The eruption was from the Emory Caldera, centered near Hillsboro Peak at the southern end of the Black Range.

History

The Mimbreno Indians settled in the area from 750 to 1250 AD. Pottery, arrowheads, and other artifacts show evidence of prehistoric Indians in the area. Indian wells, or conical holes, are found in the rocks where water would be allowed to collect.

Chapter 110 of the 1953 Laws of New Mexico created City of Rocks State Park on March 20, 1953.

Features

City of Rocks State Park provides opportunities for walks, hiking, camping, rock climbing, picnicking, wildlife viewing, and dark night-sky viewing (including a  telescope). Other features of the park include hiking trails, picnic areas and a desert botanical garden. The visitor center includes a large display area, books, maps, and information.

Facilities
The park is open all year. Nearby are the communities of Silver City and Deming. Facilities include electrical and water hookups for camping, with restrooms and hot showers. At least 50,000 people visit the park annually.

See also
 Faywood Hot Springs

References

External links

 City of Rocks State Park

Eocene volcanoes
State parks of New Mexico
Parks in Grant County, New Mexico
Protected areas established in 1953
Rock formations of New Mexico
Supervolcanoes
VEI-8 volcanoes
Calderas of New Mexico
Volcanism of New Mexico
Landforms of Grant County, New Mexico
1953 establishments in New Mexico